Kehler is a German surname.

People 
 Claude Robert "Bob" Kehler (born A1952), United States Air Force general
 Lisa Martine Kehler (née Langford, born 1967), English race walker
 Randy Kehler (born 1944) US pacifist activist and advocate for social justice
 Sonja Kehler (1933), German actress and chanson singer
 Tim Kehler (born 1971), Canadian professional ice hockey coach
 Keith Ransom-Kehler (1876–1933), US Bahá'í

Other 
 Kehler FV, German association football club from Kehl

German-language surnames
Russian Mennonite surnames